McCann Glacier is a tributary glacier which drains the east slopes of Mount Stirling in the Bowers Mountains of Antarctica, and flows east between Mount Radspinner and Markinsenis Peak into Lillie Glacier. It was mapped by the United States Geological Survey from surveys and U.S. Navy air photos, 1960–64, and was named by the Advisory Committee on Antarctic Names for Chief Utilitiesman J.M. McCann, U.S. Navy, who was a member of the McMurdo Station winter party in 1962 and took part in summer support activities, 1963–65.

References

Glaciers of Pennell Coast